Ahymara del Carmen Espinoza Echenique (born 28 May 1985 in Río Chico, Miranda) is a Venezuelan athlete specialising in the shot put. She represented her country at the 2013 World Championships without qualifying for the final.

Personal bests
Her personal best in the event is 18.19 metres set in Rio de Janeiro, Brazil in 2016. This is the current national record.
Shot put: 18.19 m –  Rio de Janeiro, 15 May 2016

Competition record

External links
 
 
 Ahymara del C. Espinoza Echenique at the 2019 Pan American Games

Living people
1985 births
Venezuelan female shot putters
Athletes (track and field) at the 2015 Pan American Games
Athletes (track and field) at the 2019 Pan American Games
Pan American Games competitors for Venezuela
World Athletics Championships athletes for Venezuela
Athletes (track and field) at the 2016 Summer Olympics
Olympic athletes of Venezuela
South American Games gold medalists for Venezuela
South American Games silver medalists for Venezuela
South American Games medalists in athletics
Competitors at the 2014 South American Games
Athletes (track and field) at the 2018 South American Games
South American Championships in Athletics winners
Athletes (track and field) at the 2020 Summer Olympics
People from Miranda (state)
21st-century Venezuelan women